The Elite League Riders' Championship is a motorcycle speedway contest between the top riders (or two riders) with the highest average points total from each club competing in the Elite League in the UK.

History
The competition replaced the Premier League Riders Championship in 1997. It was in turn replaced by the SGB Premiership Riders' Individual Championship in 2017.

Winners

See also
List of United Kingdom Speedway League Riders' champions
 Speedway in the United Kingdom

References

Speedway competitions in the United Kingdom